Muhammad Alam (reign 1826 – 1828) was the 22nd Sultan of Brunei, then known as the Bruneian Empire. Due to his tough and strict attitude, he was nicknamed Raja Api (King of Fire) and Raja Marak Berapi (Flaming King of Fire).

Early life
He was the son of Sultan Muhammad Kanzul Alam who reigned from 1807 until his death in 1826. Upon his father's death, he succeeded the throne and became Sultan Muhammad Alam. Prior to his succession, he holds the title of Pengiran Muda (Prince).

Reign (1826-1828)
His rise to power as the Sultan was disliked by most of the population of Brunei and ignored royal Bruneian tradition. In an attempt to shift public opinions on him, he began to remove people who went up against him but it backfired and made him even more unpopular. The Second Civil War broke out after the population began to rebel in support of his nephew Pengiran Omar Ali Saifuddin in becoming the Sultan.

Death
After his defeat in 1828, he was given the choice of either surrendering or to be executed, he was garroted publicly and later succeeded by Sultan Omar Ali Saifuddin II.

Legacy 

 Muhammad Alam Malay Middle School (SMMMA), school in Seria, Belait District.

References

19th-century Sultans of Brunei
1828 deaths
Fellows of the American Physical Society